The Komárno - Komárom International Street Run is a run traditionally held between the Slovak Komárno and Hungarian Komárom between April and May.

History 
On March 30, 1945, the Red Army liberated the territory of north Hungary and Slovakia from the towns of Komárno and Komárom, ending World War II. World War II on their territory.

At the end of 1974, based on the idea of three athletes (Dezső Bangha, Gyula Herczeg and István Jóny), a report appeared that the following year, April 4, on the occasion of the 30th anniversary of the liberation of Hungary and Czechoslovakia, a running competition between Komárno and Komárom was being considered. The ideas were organized by Endre Rubin, President of the Athletics Department of MTK-VM, and the District Committee of the Czechoslovak Association of Physical Education in Komárno, on the Czechoslovak side. The first run took place in 1975. 65 Hungarian and 18 Czechoslovak runners took part in the start of the 8,200-meter-long track at Lenin's Stadium in Komárom.

From the following year, the competition was also included in the calendar of competitions of the European Athletic Association. Starting and finishing stations alternated every year, in the first year the competitors started from the north side and came to the finish line from the south side, while in 1976 they started in Komárom and the race ended in Komárno. This tradition was maintained in the following years. The competition was organized by an international organizing committee set up for this purpose. The committee consisted of the heads of local authorities, sports associations.

In 1977, in addition to Hungarian and Czechoslovak athletes, Romanian, Yugoslav, East German and for the first time ever West German athletes from behind the Iron Curtain also took part.

The 1980 competition was the first to announce a special competition for women at a distance of 4,000 meters. As early as 1982, winners were announced in male adult individuals and teams, in female adults and young people, and in the male youth categories.

Almost a thousand runners have already been registered for the tenth anniversary of 1984. Although the magic line was not exceeded in the following year, from 1986 until the regime change, more than a thousand starters came to the starting line every year.

After the change of regime, the idea of liberation by the Red Army was abandoned, but the run continued during the Komárno Days, this time officially on the occasion of the revolutionary battles for the Komárno fortress in 1849. Participation is smaller and without major athletes.

Track 
The running track is flat and leads over the bridge of the border river Danube, between Komárno (Slovakia) and Komárom (Hungary). The start and finish vary between Hungary and Slovakia. The length of the track is approximately 10 km.

List of winners

References 

Komárno
Komárom
Sport in Slovakia
Sport in Hungary
Road running
10K runs